The 1925 Volta a Catalunya was the seventh edition of the Volta a Catalunya cycle race and was held from 21 May to 24 May 1925. The race started and finished in Barcelona.

Route and stages

General classification

References

1925
Volta
1925 in Spanish road cycling
May 1925 sports events